Northeast Coming is a double studio album released in 1999 by the Washington, D.C.-based go-go band Northeast Groovers.

Track listing

Personnel
Khari Pratt – bass guitar
Lamond "Maestro" Perkins – keyboards
Ronald "88" Utley – keyboards
Leonard "Daddy-O" Huggins – vocals
Ronald "Dig-Dug" Dixon –  percussions
Larry "Stomp Dogg" Atwater – drummer
Samuel "Smoke" Dews – congas, percussions
David "32" Ellis – vocals
Chris "rapper" Black – vocals
Robert "rocket" Chase – percussions

References

External links
Northeast Coming at Discogs

1999 albums
Northeast Groovers albums